Grevillea roycei is a species of flowering plant in the family Proteaceae and is endemic to the south-west of Western Australia. It is an open, erect to spreading shrub with divided leaves, the lobes linear to tapering, and more or less spherical clusters of cream-coloured and yellow flowers with a white style.

Description
The edges of the leaflets are rolled under concealing the lower surface except the midvein, and the tip is sharply pointed. The flowers are arranged on arching flowering branches in more or less sphercial clusters.

Taxonomy
Grevillea roycei was first formally described in 1986 by Donald McGillivray in his book  "New Names in Grevillea (Proteaceae)" from specimens collected by Robert Royce near Goomalling in 1962. The specific epithet (roycei) honours the collector of the type specimens.

Distribution and habitat
This grevillea grows in heath, shrubland and woodland between Amery, Goomalling, Cunderdin and Brookton in the Avon Wheatbelt bioregion of south-western Western Australia.

Conservation status
Grevillea rosieri is listed as "Priority Three" by the Government of Western Australia Department of Biodiversity, Conservation and Attractions, meaning that it is poorly known and known from only a few locations but is not under imminent threat.

See also
 List of Grevillea species

References

roycei
Proteales of Australia
Eudicots of Western Australia
Taxa named by Donald McGillivray
Plants described in 1986